Toumliline (in Standard Moroccan Amazigh, ⵜⵓⵎⵍⵉⵍⵉⵏ) is a small town and rural commune in Taroudant Province of the Souss-Massa-Drâa region of Morocco. At the time of the 2004 census, the commune had a total population of 3000 people living in 665 households.

References

Populated places in Taroudannt Province
Rural communes of Souss-Massa